Ertis is a district of Pavlodar Region in northern Kazakhstan. The administrative center of the district is the selo of Ertis. Population:

Geography
Lake Zhalauly, a briny endorheic lake, is located in the district.

References

Districts of Kazakhstan
Pavlodar Region